Fredrik Stabel (4 January 1914 – 2 July 2001) was a Norwegian illustrator and writer. He was born in Kristiania. He is particularly known for his daily satirical column in the newspaper Dagbladet over forty years (1950–1990), on the imaginary society Norsk Dusteforbund. Among his books are Snarere tvert imot, from 1960, Nok av det from 1962, and Jeg sier ikke mer! from 1978.

References

1914 births
2001 deaths
Writers from Oslo
Norwegian illustrators
Norwegian satirists
Norwegian columnists
Artists from Oslo